Valley of Terror is a 1937 American Western film directed by Albert Herman and written by John T. Neville, Sherman L. Lowe and Stanley Roberts. The film stars Kermit Maynard, Harley Wood, John Merton, Jack Ingram, Roger Williams, Hank Bell, Dick Curtis and Frank McCarroll. The film was released on January 20, 1937, by Ambassador Pictures.

Plot

Cast           
Kermit Maynard as Bob Wilson
Harley Wood as Mary Scott 
John Merton as Mark Flemming
Jack Ingram as Spud Hayes 
Roger Williams as Slim 
Hank Bell as Sheriff Judson
Dick Curtis as Buck
Frank McCarroll as Hank 
Hal Price as Fielding
Jack Casey as Clinton Deputy
George Morrell	as Lynch Mob Leader
Blackie Whiteford as Bartender

References

External links
 

1937 films
American Western (genre) films
1937 Western (genre) films
Films directed by Albert Herman
Films based on works by James Oliver Curwood
American black-and-white films
1930s English-language films
1930s American films